Bette Midler is a U.S artist; an actress, singer, comedienne.

Bette Midler may also refer to:

 Bette Midler (album), a 1973 album by Bette Midler
 Bette (album), a 2000 album by Bette Midler
 The Bette Midler Show, a 1976 video from HBO featuring Bette Midler
 Bette (TV series), a 2000-2001 TV series starring Bette Midler

See also
 The Divine Miss M (1972 album) album by Bette Midler
 Bette (disambiguation)
 Midler (surname)